The 1946–47 Scottish Cup was the 62nd staging of Scotland's most prestigious football knockout competition. The Cup was won by Aberdeen who defeated Hibernian in the final.

First round

Replays

Second round

Third round

Replays

Quarter-finals

Semi-finals

Final

Teams

See also
1946–47 in Scottish football
1946–47 Scottish League Cup

Scottish Cup seasons
1946–47 in Scottish football
Scot